Ames is a village in Montgomery County, New York, United States. The population was 145 at the 2010 census.

The Village of Ames is in the south-central part of the Town of Canajoharie and is south of the Village of Canajoharie.

Ames is one of the smallest villages in New York State.

History 
Unlike other communities in the region, settled by German settlers, Ames was settled by pioneers from New England around 1779. The village was incorporated in 1924.

The Ames Academy Building was listed on the National Register of Historic Places in 2002.

Geography

Ames is located on New York State Route 10, a north–south highway.

Demographics

As of the census of 2000, there were 173 people, 68 households, and 49 families residing in the village. The population density was 1,305.7 people per square mile (513.8/km2). There were 72 housing units at an average density of 543.4 per square mile (213.8/km2). The racial makeup of the village was 99.42% White, and 0.58% from two or more races.

There were 68 households, out of which 26.5% had children under the age of 18 living with them, 66.2% were married couples living together, 4.4% had a female householder with no husband present, and 26.5% were non-families. 22.1% of all households were made up of individuals, and 8.8% had someone living alone who was 65 years of age or older. The average household size was 2.54 and the average family size was 3.02.

In the village, the population was spread out, with 26.0% under the age of 18, 5.8% from 18 to 24, 29.5% from 25 to 44, 23.1% from 45 to 64, and 15.6% who were 65 years of age or older. The median age was 36 years. For every 100 females, there were 101.2 males. For every 100 females age 18 and over, there were 103.2 males.

The median income for a household in the village was $32,500, and the median income for a family was $38,750. Males had a median income of $30,000 versus $23,750 for females. The per capita income for the village was $17,794. About 8.7% of families and 8.8% of the population were below the poverty line, including 13.2% of those under the age of eighteen and 16.7% of those sixty-five or over.

Notable person
 Alexander Randall, sixth Governor of Wisconsin.

See also
 List of incorporated places in New York's Capital District

References

Villages in New York (state)
Villages in Montgomery County, New York